Kendall Lee Rhine (born February 13, 1943) is an American former basketball player. He played in college for the Rice Owls, then as a professional in the American Basketball Association with the Kentucky Colonels and Houston Mavericks.

References

1943 births
Living people
American men's basketball players
Basketball players at the 1967 Pan American Games
Basketball players from Illinois
Centers (basketball)
Houston Mavericks players
Kentucky Colonels players
Medalists at the 1967 Pan American Games
Pan American Games gold medalists for the United States
Pan American Games medalists in basketball
People from Eldorado, Illinois
Phillips 66ers players
Rice Owls men's basketball players
St. Louis Hawks draft picks
United States men's national basketball team players
1967 FIBA World Championship players